Wes Keely is an American drummer best known for his time in Walls of Jericho, Until the End and Remembering Never, and has also drummed for bands such as Most Precious Blood, Throwdown, Anything But Joey, The Famed, Earthmover, The Riot Before, Spit and Seattle rock band Again & Again.

References 

American punk rock drummers
Living people
Musicians from Florida
1978 births
21st-century American drummers
Walls of Jericho (band) members
Morning Again members